= Cronhielmsparken =

Park in Malmö, Sweden

Coordinates: 55°35′26″N 13°2′38″E

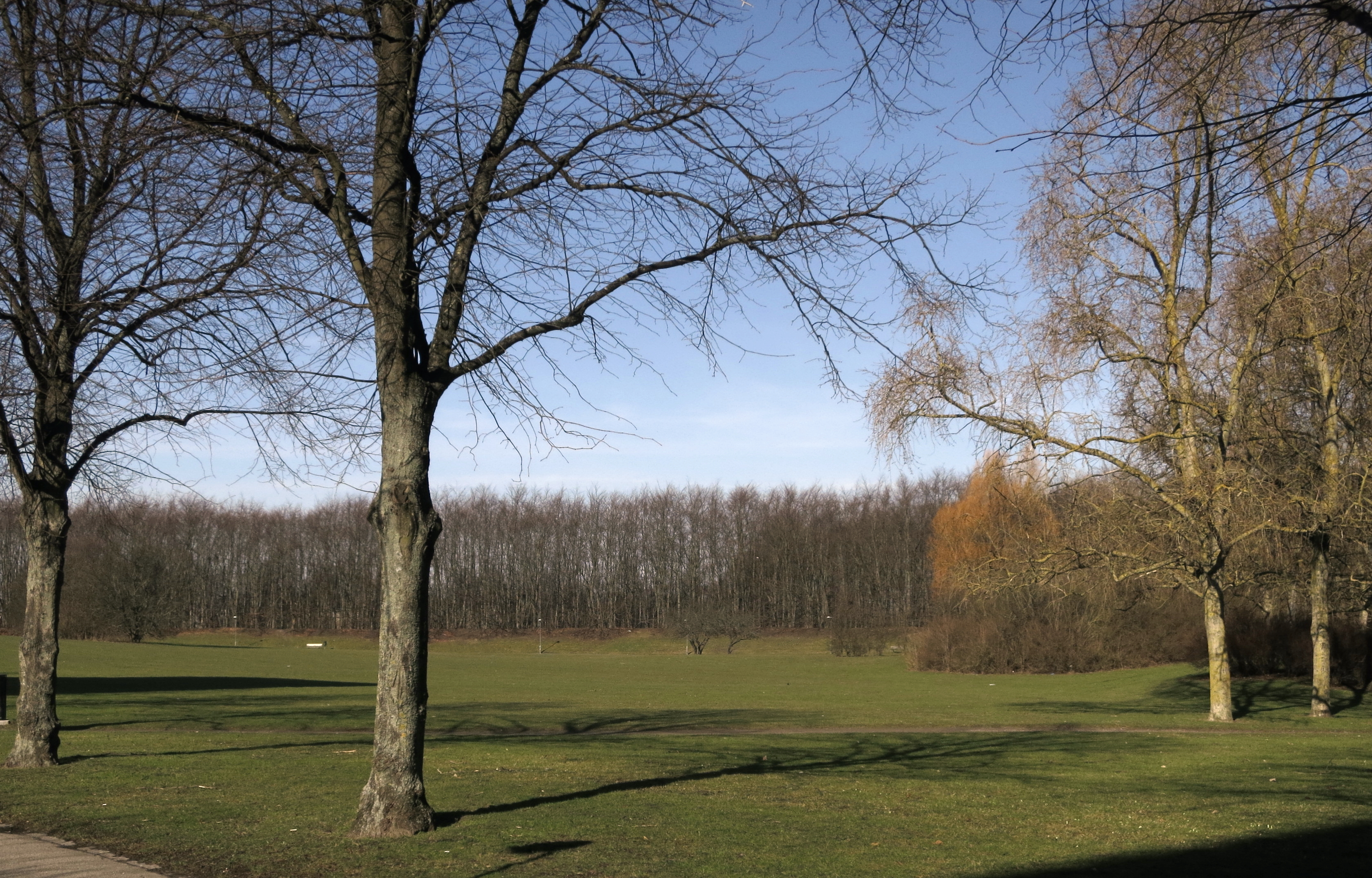
Cronhielmsparken

Cronhielmsparken is a park in Malmö, Sweden. The park was named in 1969, like the nearby Cronhielm Road, after Johan Cronhielm.
